Princess Maria Felicita of Savoy (19 March 1730 – 13 May 1801) was a princess of the House of Savoy, the third daughter of Charles Emmanuel III of Sardinia and his second wife, Polyxena of Hesse-Rotenburg.

Biography

Born at the Royal Palace of Turin, she was the third daughter of Charles Emmanuel III, King of Sardinia and his second wife Polyxena of Hesse-Rotenburg. Her mother died in 1735 when she was just four years old. Her father married again in 1737 to Elisabeth Therese of Lorraine, the youngest sister of Francis I, Holy Roman Emperor. Charles Emmanuel III and Elisabeth Therese went on to have three children, including the Duke of Chablais.

Her maternal cousins included Victor Amadeus, Prince of Carignan and his younger sister the future princesse de Lamballe, both of which were born at the court of Savoy. Her paternal cousins included Ferdinand VI of Spain, who was king of Spain at the time of her birth.

She never married. She was described as very religious. She founded, with Giovanni Battista Canaveri, a home in her native Turin for widows and destitute noble women "Convitto Principessa Maria Felicita di Savoia". Canaveri was the director. It was made possible due to an act she had her brother implement, Convitto per donne nubili e vedove, for women in the Kingdom of Sardinia.

On 6 December 1798, the French First Republic declared war on Sardinia.

Her nephew Charles Emmanuel (then king) was forced to abdicate all his territories on the Italian mainland and to withdraw to the island of Sardinia. As Charles Emmanuel took little interest in the rule of what was left of his kingdom, he and Clotilde lived in Rome and then in Naples as guests of the wealthy Colonna family. Maria Felicita went with her nephew to live as fugitives in Italy.

She died in Rome and was buried at the Royal Basilica of Superga overlooking Turin, the traditional burial place of the House of Savoy. She outlived all her siblings except the Duke of Chablais.

Ancestry

References and notes

1730 births
1801 deaths
Nobility from Turin
Princesses of Savoy
Burials at the Basilica of Superga
Daughters of kings